Sea Hawks is an Indian television series that aired on DD Metro  in the late 1990s. The story was based on the life and times of the Indian Coast Guard officers. The series stars Om Puri, R. Madhavan, Niki Aneja, Leelawar Tendulkar, Anup Soni, Simone Singh, Manoj Pahwa, Milind Soman and others. It was directed by Anubhav Sinha and produced by Anirudhya Mitra of UTV. Later, it was directed by Shivam Nair while Anubhav Sinha took up the writing of the show. The series aired again in 2002 on Star Plus. It was produced by UTV.

The plot revolves around the activities of a mafia don's network, the coast guard, and the police and includes underwater and action sequences.

Cast 
 Anup Soni as ACP Kumar
 Simone Singh as Rupal, Kumar's wife
 R. Madhavan as Deputy Commandant Preet
 Niki Aneja as Dr Natasha
 Manoj Pahwa as Mafia kingpin Dev Bhamra
 Om Puri as Uncle Sam
 Milind Soman as Commandant Vikram Rajpoot
Vineet Kumar
Akhil Mishra Navy Officer and a Father figure to Commandant Preet

References

External links 

UTV Television
Indian Armed Forces in fiction
DD Metro original programming
1997 Indian television series debuts
1998 Indian television series endings